Charitella is a genus of bristle flies in the family Tachinidae.

Species
Charitella argentea (Shima, 1980)
Charitella flavifrons (Byun & Han, 2009)
Charitella gracilis Mesnil, 1957
Charitella nigrescens Mesnil, 1977
Charitella proclinata (Shima, 1980)
Charitella whitmorei (Cerretti, 2012)
Charitella xanthokolos (Byun & Han, 2009)

References

Exoristinae
Diptera of Asia
Diptera of Africa
Tachinidae genera